Ben Shemen Forest is the largest forest in central Israel and one of the largest in the entire country, covering an area of 22,000 dunams (22 Km²). In the forest there are picnic spots, hiking and bicycle routes. It is located on both sides of Route 443, between the Ben Shemen Interchange and the city of Modi'in-Maccabim-Re'ut. The first trees were planted by the Jewish National Fund in 1908.

References 

Forests of Israel
Hevel Modi'in Regional Council
Jewish National Fund forests and parks